Vestal Peak, elevation , is a summit in the Needle Mountains of southwest Colorado. The peak is southeast of Silverton in the Weminuche Wilderness.

See also

List of Colorado mountain ranges
List of Colorado mountain summits
List of Colorado fourteeners
List of Colorado 4000 meter prominent summits
List of the most prominent summits of Colorado
List of Colorado county high points

References

External links

San Juan Mountains (Colorado)
Mountains of La Plata County, Colorado
North American 4000 m summits
Rio Grande National Forest
San Juan National Forest
Mountains of Colorado